I Love Life, Thank You is the sixth mixtape by American recording artist Mac Miller. In 2011, Miller started the "Road 2 a Million Fans" series, during which he released a new song for every 100,000 Twitter followers he accumulated. On October 14, 2011, he released I Love Life, Thank You upon reaching one million followers. Seven of the thirteen tracks on the mixtape had previously been released throughout the course of the series. On July 22, 2022, the mixtape was re-released to all streaming services.

Promotion
On April 17, 2011, upon reaching 300,000 followers on Twitter, Miller released the song "People Under the Stairs" and started the "Road 2 a Million Fans" campaign. "Love Lost" was released on May 19, upon reaching 400,000 followers. Upon reaching 500,000 followers, "Family First", which features Talib Kweli, was released on June 20. On July 15, he reached 600,000 followers and released "Just a Kid". Upon reaching 700,000 followers on August 7, Miller released "The Miller Family Reunion. Miller reached 800,000 followers on August 26 and released "Cold Feet". On September 20, he reached 900,000 followers and released "Willie Dynamite".

Track listing

Sample credits
 "I Love Life, Thank You" contains a sample of "How I Know" by Toro y Moi.
 "People Under the Stairs" contains a sample of "San Francisco Knights" by People Under the Stairs.
 "Love Lost" contains a sample of "Love Lost" by The Temper Trap.

Credits and personnel
Credits adapted from DatPiff.

 Mac Miller – primary artist ; production 
 9th Wonder – production 
 Big Jerm – production 
 Black Diamond – production 
 Bun B – featured artist 
 Cardo – production 
 Clams Casino – production 
 Brandun DeShay – production 
 E. Dan – production 
 Like – production 
 Talib Kweli – featured artist 
 Sir Michael Rocks – featured artist 
 Noam Wallenberg – engineer

Charts

References

2011 mixtape albums
Mac Miller albums
Albums produced by Mac Miller